UNTV Why News is an English language primetime newscast on UNTV that covers and reports the headline-grabbing issues and subjects in the country. Aired from Monday to Friday at 8:30 PM to 9:30 PM (PST UTC+8)(new timeslot on March 7, 2022). This was first aired on February 2, 2015. It is anchored by Victor Cosare, Harlene Delgado, and William Thio.

Anchors 
Harlene Delgado (2020–present)
William Thio (2015, 2017–present)
Victor Cosare (2022–present)

Substitute Anchors

Erin Tañada
Bernard Dadis
Leslie Longboen

Former Anchors
Gerry Alcantara (2015-2017)
Darlene Basingan (2016-2018)
Rheena Villamor-Camara (2018-2019)
Alex Baltazar (2019-2020)
Diego Castro III (2015–2022)
Angela Lagunzad

See also
Progressive Broadcasting Corporation 
UNTV News and Rescue
DWAO-TV 
Daniel Razon

Members Church of God International
UNTV (Philippines) original programming
Philippine television news shows
2015 Philippine television series debuts
English-language television shows